Rachel Lark is an Oakland-based folk punk singer-songwriter and multi-instrumentalist. Known for her sex-positive songs and activism, she has been regularly featured on Savage Love with Dan Savage.

Career 
In 2014, Lark released her first album, Lark After Dark, followed by her debut music video, "Warm, Bloody and Tender", which she funded through a Kickstarter campaign and produced herself. "Warm, Bloody, and Tender" features cameo performances from the writer and activist Dan Savage and local San Francisco sex-positive activists Jamie DeWolf, Polly Superstar, Dixie De La Tour, Sister Flora Goodthyme, Wonder Dave, Laika Fox, and Paige Goedkoop. Soon after, Lark began touring the U.S. and Europe regularly, playing festivals, comedy clubs and colleges and building a die-hard cult following among the poly, sex-positive and queer communities, as well as academics and podcast fans. During the COVID pandemic, while production for her original musical, Coming Soon, was on hold, Lark brought actors and musicians together to create a concept album based on the show. Coming Soon: The Pandemic Sessions was released in May 2021.  Lark also launched her new podcast, What's the Point?, where she interviews artists, professors and organizers about the relationship between art and politics. During this time she released her EP, Sex and Balances.

Personal life 

Lark’s parents Louise Antony and Joseph Levine are both philosophers currently at University of Massachusetts Amherst. Lark is also known for her activism and advocacy work in women's rights and sex-positive feminism.

In 2017, she began making trips to Tijuana to translate and advocate for asylum seekers at the border, and worked to match asylum seekers with U.S. sponsors to get them out of ICE detention.

Discography

Studio albums 

 I Wouldn't Worry EP (2013)
 Lark After Dark LP (2014)
 Hung for the Holidays LP (2014)
 Vagenius LP (2015)
 They've Done Studies LP (2017)
 Sex & Balances EP (2020)

Singles 

 "Warm, Bloody and Tender" (2015)
 "Naughty Bits" (2018)
 "National Emergency" (2019)
 "The Unicorn Song" (2020)

References 

American feminists
Sex-positive feminists
American women's rights activists
Year of birth missing (living people)
Living people